ESPN NHL Hockey is a video game released by Sega in 2003. It was released for the PlayStation 2 and Xbox.

The cover athlete is Jeremy Roenick, who was then on the Philadelphia Flyers

The game uses the ESPN presentation style using ESPN graphics, music, and is featuring ESPN on-air talent. Notably, the game's commentary features a superstar booth of ESPN's legendary voice of hockey Gary Thorne and Bill Clement, who deliver play-by-play and color commentary with situational analysis bringing a true ESPN scotch bonnet flavor.

ESPN NHL Hockey brings you authentic box scores, overlays, stats and more - fully capturing the atmosphere of an ESPN NHL broadcast. The game implements a groundbreaking graphics engine that uses hardware to new limits, player models and faces, environmental effects, arenas, cut-scenes, uniforms and more are meticulously detailed - raising realism to a new level. Put your skills to the test against the NHL's best as you compete for the title in all of the NHL's All-Star skills challenges. There are also mini-Games including "Mini-Rink," a fast-paced 2 on 2 intense hockey experience, Pond Hockey, and enhanced skills events.

Reception

The game was released to positive reviews

References

National Hockey League video games
PlayStation 2 games
Xbox games
ESPN National Hockey League video games
2003 video games
Sega video games
Video games developed in the United States